Holyhead Hotspur Football Club is a football club based in Holyhead, Anglesey playing in the Cymru North.

The team's first choice strip is burgundy shirts, burgundy shorts and white socks. The second choice strip is all blue. 

Holyhead Hotspur play at the New Oval ground opposite the leisure centre in Holyhead.  The new stadium was opened in a ceremony on 27 July 2007 with a friendly match played against a Wolverhampton Wanderers XI.

Club history

Holyhead Hotspur was formed in 1990, initially playing in the Anglesey League. A group of local football lads who were playing for another local team decided to start their own team with the help of Ken Chambers and Gary Williams. To choose a team name, they each put their suggestion in a hat and the name HOTSPUR was drawn out, so Holyhead Hotspur was born.

In 1996, following the success of Holyhead Hotspur in the Anglesey League and Gwynedd League, the club amalgamated with the other four clubs representing Holyhead to form Holyhead Hotspur and Holyhead Hotspur Reserves.

Holyhead Hotspur were promoted to the Cymru Alliance league for the 1998–99 season after winning the Welsh Alliance League in the 1997–98 season. At the same time, Holyhead Hotspur Reserves also saw promotion to the Gwynedd League.

In summer 1997, local junior football club Holyhead Peibio Youth amalgamated with Holyhead Hotspur and formed the club's junior branch. Now known as Holyhead Hotspur Peibio Youth, the juniors are represented at Under 7, Under 9, Under 11, Under 12, Under 14, Under 16 and Under 18 age groups. Holyhead Hotspur Peibio Youth was the first organisation in the whole of Wales to receive the Welsh Football Trust's Fun Football Accreditation, allowing the Club to host regular soccer school activities as well as football in the community programme, involving a newly formed ladies team (Cybi Ladies) and a learning difficulties team (Clwb Cybi). In 2009 they were one of only four clubs on Anglesey to be awarded silver accreditation by McDonald's and the Football Association of Wales. Silver accreditation was retained for the 2010–11 season.

In summer 2011, girls' teams were reintroduced into the club. Teams at under 10 and under 12 were affiliated to the North Wales Girls League.

In 2018, Darren Garmey and Nick Dumbarton became Manager and Assistant Manager, and Ben Williams became chairman. The reserve side was taken over by Mike Kelly, Tom Scott, Martyn Mcclymont and John Jones, playing in the Anglesey league. In the 2018-19 season, Holyhead Hotspur were relegated from the Cymru Alliance to the Welsh Alliance League after being in the Cymru Alliance for six years.

Stadium
The club play at the New Stadium, which they moved into in 2007. The old ground still stands next to the new one, and is in use for some local games. The ground was chosen to host several games, including the final, of the 2019 Inter Games Football Tournament.

Management team 

It was announced on 13 September 2009 that Campbell Harrison was to step down as manager after 3 seasons in charge. On 16 September 2009, Mark Williams, who was assistant manager to Campbell, was offered the post of manager. He duly accepted, and promoted reserve team boss Emlyn Manley-Williams to be his assistant manager on 8 October 2009. Emlyn was appointed first team manager at the start of the 2011 season which heralded unprecedented success in his first season. Emlyn and his backroom staff of Neil Bell and Mark Jat tendered their resignations in May 2013. On 6 June 2013, Campbell Harrison was re-appointed first team manager. He gave up the reins in 2018, with Darren Garmey and Nick Dumbarton replacing him.

Manager: Darren Garmey
Assistant managers: Nick Dumbarton

Current squad

References

External links
 Holyhead Hotspur FC official site
 Holyhead Hotspur Peibio Youth FC
 Cymru Alliance

Football clubs in Wales
Association football clubs established in 1990
Sport in Anglesey
1990 establishments in Wales
Holyhead
Cymru Alliance clubs
Welsh Alliance League clubs
Gwynedd League clubs
Anglesey League clubs
Cymru North clubs